Bhilai Power House railway station is the second main railway station in Durg district in the Indian state of Chhattisgarh. Its code is BPHB. It serves the Bhilai urban areas. The station consists of three platforms. The Bhilai Power House is one of five in Bhilai city. It is well connected with other major cities. It has been rated grade A by Indian Railways.

Major trains 
 Raipur–Dalli Rajhara Express
 Durg–Ambikapur Express
 Shivnath Express
 Sarnath Express
 Shalimar–Lokmanya Tilak Terminus Express
 Bhagat Ki Kothi–Bilaspur Express
 Bilaspur–Bikaner Express
 Durg–Nautanwa Express (via Sultanpur) 
 Puri–Ahmedabad Express
 Chhattisgarh Express
 Puri–Durg Express
 South Bihar Express
 Gevra Road-Nagpur Shivnath Express
 Howrah–Ahmedabad Superfast Express
 Amarkantak Express
 Nagpur–Bilaspur InterCity Express
 Puri–Ahmedabad Express
 Visakhapatnam–Durg Passenger
 Raipur–Itwari Passenger
 Tatanagar–Itwari Passenger

References

Railway stations in Durg district
Raipur railway division
Transport in Bhilai